Edward Roger John Owen (27 May 1935 – 23 December 2018) was a British historian who wrote several classic works on the history of the modern Middle East.  His research interests included the economic, social and political history of the Middle East, especially Egypt, from 1800 to the present, as well as the theories of imperialism, including military occupations.

Biography
He read Politics, Philosophy and Economics at Magdalen College, Oxford, from 1956 to 1959, followed by a D Phil in Economic History at St. Antony's College, from 1960 to 1964. One of his close advisers was the renowned Middle East historian Albert Hourani. His thesis which was on the cotton production and the development of the economy in nineteenth-century Egypt was later published into a book.

When in the 1960s  new postgraduate course in modern Middle Eastern studies were introduced at St Antony's College and a raft of new posts created with British government funding, Owen was appointed in Economic and Social History in 1964. He served as Director of St. Antony's College Middle East Centre, from 1971-4, 1980-2, 1986-8, and 1991-3.

Subsequently he became the A.J. Meyer Professor of Middle East History at Harvard University and was the director of Harvard's Center for Middle Eastern Studies (CMES).

In addition to his teaching and scholarship, Owen frequently wrote columns for the English-language versions of the Arabic newspapers Al-Hayat and Al-Ahram.

He was a member of the Middle East Studies Association of North America, also known as MESA.

He died on 23 December 2018.

Awards and honors

In 2007 he received a Doctorate in Humane Letters from the American University of Cairo.

In July 2010, he received the prestigious “Award for Outstanding Contributions to Middle Eastern Studies 2010” from the World Congress for Middle Eastern Studies (WOCMES) in Barcelona.

In 2012, he received the Giorgio Levi Della Vida medal for Excellence in Islamic studies, Von Grunebaum Center UCLA.

Selected works
 The Rise and Fall of Arab Presidents for Life. Harvard University Press (2012) 
 Lord Cromer: Victorian Imperialist, Edwardian Proconsul (2004)
 State, Power and Politics in the Making of the Modern Middle East. Routledge, revised version (2004)
 A History of the Middle East Economies in the 20th Century, with Şevket Pamuk). I.B. Tauris (1999)
 The Middle East in the World Economy 1800–1914 (1981)
 Cotton and the Egyptian Economy, 1820–1914 (1969)

References

External links
Faculty page at Harvard University
, March 17, 2008.
One Hundred Years of Middle Eastern Oil. By Prof. E. Roger Owen, 2008.

1935 births
2018 deaths
Alumni of Magdalen College, Oxford
British historians
Fellows of St Antony's College, Oxford
Historians of the Middle East
Middle Eastern studies in the United States
Harvard University faculty